The 45th Signal Regiment is an inactive signals regiment of the Italian Army. The unit was formed in 1957 as a battalion, which operated and maintained the army's telecommunication network in the Apulia, Basilicata, Calabria, Campania and Molise regions. In 1975 the battalion was named for Monte Vulture and received its own flag. In 1993 the battalion entered the newly formed 45th Signal Regiment, which was disbanded in 2001. After the regiment was disbanded the Battalion "Vulture" was transferred to the 46th Signal Regiment, which operates and maintains the army's telecommunications network on the island of Sicily.

History 
On 1 October 1957 the XLV Signal Battalion was formed in Bagnoli with the personnel and materiel of the existing 9th Territorial Signal Company in Bari and the 10th Territorial Signal Company in Bagnoli. The battalion consisted of a command, a command and services platoon, and three signals companies. The battalion was assigned to the X Territorial Military Command in Naples. On 1 August 1971 the battalion moved from Bagnoli to Naples.

During the 1975 army reform the army disbanded the regimental level and newly independent battalions were granted for the first time their own flags. During the reform signal battalions were renamed for mountain passes. On 1 October 1975 the XLV Signal Battalion was renamed to 45th Signal Battalion "Vulture". The battalion consisted of a command, a command and services platoon, and two signal companies. The battalion was assigned to the Signal Command of the Southern Military Region and operated and maintained the army's telecommunication network in the Apulia, Basilicata, Calabria (minus the province of Reggio Calabria), Campania and Molise regions. On 12 November 1976 the battalion was granted a flag by decree 846 of the President of the Italian Republic Giovanni Leone.

On 1 September 1984 the battalion consisted of a command, command and services company, the 1st TLC Infrastructure Managing Company in Naples, and the 2nd TLC Infrastructure Managing Company in Bari. On 1 January 1985 the battalion added the 3rd Field Support Company. On 2 April 1991 the battalion moved from Naples to San Giorgio a Cremano, where the 2nd TLC Infrastructure Managing Company joined the battalion on 1 June of the same year.

On 15 September 1993 the 45th Signal Battalion "Vulture" lost its autonomy and the next day the battalion entered the newly formed 45th Signal Regiment as Battalion "Vulture". On the same date the flag of the 45th Signal Battalion "Vulture" was transferred from the battalion to the 45th Signal Regiment.

On 4 May 1998 the battalion's command and the 2nd TLC Infrastructure Managing Company moved from San Giorgio a Cremano to Nocera Inferiore. On 31 December 2000 the 45th Signal Regiment was disbanded and the next day the Battalion "Vulture" joined the 46th Signal Regiment, while the flag of the 45th Signal Regiment was transferred to the Shrine of the Flags in the Vittoriano in Rome.

Current structure 
As of 2022 the Battalion "Vulture" consists of:

  Battalion "Vulture", in Nocera Inferiore
 Command and Logistic Support Company
 3rd Area Support Signal Company
 4th C4 Support Signal Company

The Command and Logistic Support Company fields the following platoons: C3 Platoon, Transport and Materiel Platoon, Medical Platoon, and Commissariat Platoon.

References

Signal Regiments of Italy